Cladonia incrassata or the powder-foot British soldiers cup lichen is a species of cup lichen in the family Cladoniaceae. Found in Europe and North America, it was formally described as a new species in 1828 by German botanist Heinrich Gustav Flörke. A colloquial name for the lichen is "powder-foot British soldiers".

See also
List of Cladonia species

References

incrassata
Lichen species
Lichens described in 1827
Lichens of Europe
Lichens of North America
Taxa named by Heinrich Gustav Flörke